Wadi Ejili is a wadi, or seasonal watercourse, in the Hajar Mountains of Ras Al Khaimah, United Arab Emirates. It runs down from the confluence of the Wadi Shawka and Wadi Esfai to run into the Wadi Helo at the village of Fayyad, on the Sharjah-Kalba Highway (E102).

Extent 
The wadi runs from the northwest to the southeast Hajar Mountain ranges through the settlement of Al Ejili. A number of abandoned settlements line the course of the wadi, as well as plentiful modern plantations. There are petroglyphs etched in the rocks of the wadi, which is frequently subject to intense rainfall and flash floods in both winter and summer months.

Petroglyphs 
Distinctive petroglyphs, or stone carvings, of camels, bulls, other animals and both male and female figures are to be found in the Wadi Ejili. Carvings featuring bulls include a solid bull with long horns held on a rope by a man with upraised arms. These are present despite no contemporary evidence of wells operated by using bulls to raise water in the area. Rock carvings to either side of the wadi depict leopards and possibly wolves, including a carving of a wolf apparently pulling at a man’s .

Flora 
A study of flora from the Wadi Ejili, focusing on seeds collected from specimens of the traditional medicinal plant Tephrosia apollinea, explored the exogenous production of silver nanoparticles by the plant. A perennial shrub native to the United Arab Emirates and found in lower mountain regions, Tephrosia apollinea has long been used as a traditional medicine to relieve nasal congestion, earache, wounds, and bone fractures and it has been found to have insecticidal, anticancer and antibacterial properties. The study is thought to be the first time the antimicrobial activity of silver nanoparticles synthesized via living plants has been observed.

Gallery

See also 
 List of wadis of the United Arab Emirates

References 

Geography of the United Arab Emirates
Geography of the Emirate of Ras Al Khaimah
History of the United Arab Emirates